The 2008 Naciria bombing occurred on January 2, 2008 when a bomb detonated into the headquarters of the Algerian police in the town of Naciria, Boumerdès Province, Algeria killing 4 and injuring 20. The Al-Qaeda Organization in the Islamic Maghreb is suspected as being responsible.

See also
 Terrorist bombings in Algeria
 List of terrorist incidents, 2008

References

Boumerdès Province
Suicide car and truck bombings in Algeria
Mass murder in 2008
Terrorist incidents in Algeria
Terrorist incidents in Algeria in 2008
2008 murders in Algeria
Islamic terrorism in Algeria